The George Parks Highway (numbered Interstate A-4 and signed Alaska Route 3), usually called simply the Parks Highway, runs 323 miles (520 km) from the Glenn Highway 35 miles (56 km) north of Anchorage to Fairbanks in the Alaska Interior. The highway, originally known as the Anchorage-Fairbanks Highway, was completed in 1971, and given its current name in 1975.

The highway, which mostly parallels the Alaska Railroad, is one of the most important roads in Alaska. It is the main route between Anchorage and Fairbanks (Alaska's two largest metropolitan areas), the principal access to Denali National Park and Preserve and Denali State Park, and the main highway in the Matanuska-Susitna Valley. The route's Interstate designation is not signed; rather, its entire length is signed as Alaska Route 3.

It is a common misconception that the name "Parks Highway" comes from the road's proximity to the Denali state and national parks; it is in fact in honor of George Alexander Parks, governor of the Territory of Alaska from 1925 to 1933. However, the aptness of the name was recognized when it was chosen.

Mileposts along the Parks Highway do not begin with 0 (zero).  Instead, they begin with Mile 35 (km 56), continuing the milepost numbering of the Glenn Highway where the two highways intersect near Palmer.  The 0 (zero) mile marker for the Glenn Highway is at its terminus in downtown Anchorage at the intersection of East 5th Avenue and Gambell Street.  Thus mileposts along the Parks Highway reflect distance from Anchorage, which is not actually on the Parks Highway.

There are two sections of the highway that are built to freeway standards. These include an area near the highway's intersection with the Glenn Highway in Palmer and a stretch known as the Robert J. Mitchell Expressway in Fairbanks leading to the highway's junction with the Richardson Highway (AK 2).

Interstate Highway System

George Parks Highway is part of the unsigned part of the Interstate Highway System as Interstate A-4.

Exit list

In the "Mile" column, the first number is the actual mileage of the Parks Highway, and the second mile is based on the mileposts along the highway itself.

See also
 
 
 Tornio Highway

References

External links

 A journey down the George Parks Highway 

Alaska
Interstate Highways in Alaska
State highways in Alaska
Transportation in Denali Borough, Alaska
Transportation in Fairbanks North Star Borough, Alaska
Transportation in Matanuska-Susitna Borough, Alaska
Transportation in Unorganized Borough, Alaska
Yukon–Koyukuk Census Area, Alaska